The Chesapeake Bay Trust is a non-profit organization established by the Maryland General Assembly in 1985.  Its mission is to support restoration and environmental education efforts that improve the health of the Chesapeake Bay watershed and Maryland's other natural resources. The organization makes millions of dollars in grants per year. The organization receives no public tax dollars.  It is funded primarily through sales of commemorative Chesapeake Bay license plates, voluntary donations to the Chesapeake and Endangered Species Fund, and partnerships with other funders and foundations.  Headquartered in Annapolis, Maryland, the organization has repeatedly received four stars (the highest possible rating) from Charity Navigator, an independent charity evaluator.

References

External links
 Chesapeake Bay Trust
 BayPlate.org (Chesapeake Bay Trust)

Chesapeake Bay watershed
Environmental organizations based in Maryland
Environment of Maryland
1985 establishments in Maryland
Water organizations in the United States
Annapolis, Maryland